Fully fashioned knitting machines are those warp knitting knitting machines which can shape a fabric by adding and reducing stitches. This method of shaping improves the fit of an article.

Flat knitting machines are those machines which produce flat fabric of even width or by increasing or decreasing the number of stitches in the rows, flat but shaped pieces of fabric to be subsequently made up by sewing. Flat machines include machines for ordinary (weft) knitting and warp knitting.

References
 
 Harmonized Commodity Description and Coding System by World Custom Organization

Knitting